Lithocarpus formosanus is a species of tree in the family Fagaceae. L. formosanus is a medium-sized tree with crooked trunk and many branches. It is endemic to Taiwan as it only occurs in the Hengchun Peninsula in the extreme south of the country. Only single population of fewer than 50 individuals survives.

Lithocarpus formosanus is similar to L. dodonaeifolius, and their identity as separate species has been questioned. Molecular methods suggest that they are closely related but distinct species.

References

formosanus
Endemic flora of Taiwan
Trees of Taiwan
Critically endangered flora of Asia
Taxonomy articles created by Polbot